Ål Bygdamuseum, a small museum on the farm Leksvol in Ål municipality in Viken county, Norway, is a subsidiary of Hallingdal Museum. It includes 30 old buildings, including the house from Leksvol farm which dates from about 1600, a mountain farm (støl) with a stone building, and a cotter's farm place.

References

External links
 Official site, — in Norwegian

Ål
Museums in Viken
Open-air museums in Norway